Benchley is a surname. Notable people with the surname include:

Henry Wetherby Benchley (1822–1867), American politician
Nat Benchley (21st century), American actor
Nathaniel Benchley (1915–1981), American author
Peter Benchley (1940–2006), American author
Robert Benchley (1889–1945), American humorist

Other:
Benchley, satirical comic strip created by Mort Drucker and Jerry Dumas.